Kampong Sungai Teraban is a village in Belait District, Brunei, near the district's principal town Kuala Belait. It is one of the administrative villages within Mukim Kuala Belait.

Geography 
The village is located at the mouth of the Belait River, and on the opposite bank of the town centre of Kuala Belait. It is also the westernmost settlement in the country, near Sungai Tujoh of the Brunei–Malaysia border. South of the village is the former Kampong Rasau and the Rasau oil field. Kampung Sungai Teraban has an area of  starting from the Rasau Bridge Toll to the Sungai Tujoh area.

History 
The name "Teraban" is believed to have derived from the Belait language-word  which means 'a resting or stopping place' — it is believed that the area was once a stopping place for boats and ships on the way upstream to Kuala Balai which was once the administrative centre of what is now Kuala Belait. 

It is believed that the village was founded by a Melanau who migrated from the present-day Sarawak. The original inhabitants were the Belait people and they were mostly fisherman.

Economy 
Since the village is a fishing village that has been inherited from the past until now and continues to grow into a fishing village until now, the main result of the village is of course fishing and the products they introduce are also based on marine resources such as fish snacks that are developed by the Women's Bureau through the project Satu Kampung Satu Produk (1K1P) in addition to working on dodol.

Demography 
The majority of the villagers are Muslim and the Malays who come from Melanau, Sarawak and have long been citizens of Brunei live in the village the most, followed by the Chinese and a small number of foreign nationalities such as Indonesia, Thailand, Bangladesh and India. In addition to working as fishermen, some also serve the government, Brunei Shell Petroleum (BSP) and other private companies.

Transportation

Road 
Access to the village from Kuala Belait and elsewhere in the country involves crossing the Belait River. It is currently served by the Rasau Bridge and replaced the ferry service which is now no longer in operation. The two bridges connecting Sungai Teraban and Rasau were completed in October 1969. Project costed B$5,214.

Water 
Boat owners in the area will be able to park their vessels at a jetty that has been refurbished after Brunei Shell Petroleum (BSP) gave it back to the neighborhood. The Sungai Teraban jetty currently has steel railings from the ground out to the ocean, a metal platform for small boats to dock on, and a ramp going up to its walkway. The more than 20-year-old jetty is immediately close to the former Sungai Teraban ferry point, where vehicles from Kuala Belait were once conveyed prior to the construction of the Rasau Toll Bridge.

Infrastructures 
The first piped water supply was installed in the village in 1963. Previously, the water supply was obtained through rainwater. 

The village has a petrol station; the Kampong Sungai Teraban Farmers Cooporative's Petrol Station was opened in 2002.

There is a government plan to develop the village into a border town and free trade area in 2006.

Despite having access to a number of basic amenities, the village nevertheless has issues, such as inadequate street lighting, particularly near the mosque, and some lights that are not functioning. Similar to this, numerous roads have been broken, making it easy for villagers' homes and roadways to flood during the rainy season.

Housing 
In 2015, said village head Awang Mohd. Mersidi, the number of residents decreased from 1,300 people to 1,100 people because they have moved to the National Housing Plan (RPN) in Panaga, Lumut and Seria as well as to other districts. Despite this, it is expected that there will be a new influx with the construction of flats and apartments built in the catchment area of the village.

Education 
The local primary school is Sungai Teraban Primary School. A temporary building was built in 1968 by the villagers on a  site. It was then replaced by a permanent building which was inaugurated in 1983.

Religion 
The village mosque is Kampong Sungai Teraban Mosque. It was completed in 1994 at a cost of B$266,378 and can accommodate 1,400 worshippers. Among the facilities available in the mosque are the cremation room and the kutubkhanah room.

Recreation 
Near the community hall, three huts have been built which were jointly developed by the Sungai Teraban Village Consultative Council (MPK) with the cooperation of the Belait District Department, which are used as a place to rest and carry out any village projects and activities as well as to brighten up the community hall which is the main focus of further strengthening the unity of the village community.

References 

Sungai Teraban
Belait District